Estivareilles may refer to the following places in France:

 Estivareilles, Allier, a commune in the department of Allier
 Estivareilles, Loire, a commune in the department of Loire